Andrew Avalos (born November 5, 1981) is an American football coach and former player. He is head football coach at Boise State University, his alma mater. He previously worked as an assistant at schools including Boise State and Oregon before returning to Boise State as head coach.

Playing career
During his tenure as a linebacker at Boise State, he amassed 365 tackles, which was fourth all-time in Boise State history. He also led Boise State in tackles every year from 2002 to 2004. He was named first-team All-Western Athletic Conference honors in 2003 and 2004. In 2016, he was listed in the top 30 players in Boise State history since Boise State installed their famous blue turf in 1986.

Avalos had a 92-yard interception return for a touchdown in the 2004 Liberty Bowl.

Coaching career

Early coaching career
After coaching the linebackers at Corona High School, which was where he went to high school, he joined the Colorado coaching staff as a graduate assistant under Dan Hawkins in 2006. He mainly helped Brian Cabral with the outside linebackers there. He was there until 2008.

He left Colorado for NCAA Division II school Nebraska-Kearney to coach the defensive line. While he was there, Nebraska-Kearney went 20–4 and made the NCAA Division II playoffs both years he was there. He coached linebackers at Sacramento State during the 2011 season.

Boise State
Avalos was hired at his alma mater, Boise State, in 2012 as their defensive line coach. Boise State’s rush defense ranked 11th nationally in sacks in 2012 (2.92), and tied for 30th in tackles-for-loss (6.7) in 2013. He was also notable during this time for coaching future NFL Pro-Bowler DeMarcus Lawrence. Lawrence was ranked tied for 18th in sacks per game (0.86) in 2012, and tied for 10th nationally in 2013 (0.88).

Before 2014, he was moved to become Boise State’s linebackers coach. Boise State forced 31 turnovers in both 2014, where they ranked ninth, and 2015, where they ranked fifth.

Following his positional coaching jobs at Boise State, he was promoted to defensive coordinator in 2016. His defenses were consistent, as they ranked 29th, 38th, and 30th from 2016–2018 in team defense. He coached 2017 Mountain West Player of the Year Leighton Vander Esch, three–time first team All-Mountain West recipient Curtis Weaver, and five different first team All-Mountain West players when he was the defensive coordinator.

Oregon
On February 27, 2019, Avalos was hired to serve as Oregon’s defensive coordinator, replacing Jim Leavitt. Under Avalos, Oregon’s team defense went from 49th in 2018 to ninth in 2019. Also in 2019, the #2 recruit in the country according to 247Sports.com, Kayvon Thibodeaux, committed to Oregon. He had nine sacks and one forced fumble in his first season as a Duck.

Return to Boise State
On January 8, 2021, Boise State hired Avalos as their new head football coach.

Personal life
Avalos and his wife, Summer, have two daughters, Paityn and Paige.

Head coaching record

References

1981 births
Living people
American football linebackers
Boise State Broncos football coaches
Boise State Broncos football players
Colorado Buffaloes football coaches
Nebraska–Kearney Lopers football coaches
Oregon Ducks football coaches
Sacramento State Hornets football coaches
Sportspeople from Corona, California
Coaches of American football from California
Players of American football from California